The 1st Airborne Shock Infantry Regiment, then named the 1st Shock Regiment, is a former parachute unit of the French Army, created on 1 October 1945 and dissolved on 1 February 1947.

Flag
Since 1 January 1964 the National Commando Training Center has been entrusted with the Colour of the 1st Airborne Shock Infantry Regiment, which has the following battle honours sewn in gold letters:
Corsica 1943
Elba Island 1944
Cape Negro - Toulon 1944
Upper Alsace 1944-1945
Indochina 1947-1948 1951-1954
AFN 1952–1962.

See also
 List of French paratrooper units

References

Bibliography
Collectif, Histoire des parachutistes français Tomes 1 et 2, éditions Société de production littéraire, 1975.
Jacques Sicard, Militaria Magazine no 313, p. 20-25.

Parachute infantry regiments of France
Military units and formations established in 1945
20th-century regiments of France